Musetti is an Italian surname. Notable people with the surname include:

Lorenzo Musetti (born 2002), Italian tennis player
Riccardo Musetti (born 1983), Italian footballer
Valentino Musetti (born 1943), Italian-born English stunt performer and racing driver

Italian-language surnames